The Tombstone Epitaph is a Tombstone, Arizona, monthly publication that covers the history and culture of the Old West. Founded in January 1880 (with its first issue published on Saturday May 1, 1880), it is the oldest continually published newspaper in Arizona.

History
The Epitaph long has been noted for its coverage of the infamous Gunfight at the O.K. Corral on October 26, 1881, and its continuing research interest in Wyatt Earp, Doc Holliday and their outlaw adversaries the Cochise County Cowboys. In 2005, it presented for the first time a sketch of the O.K. Corral gunfight hand-drawn by Wyatt Earp shortly before his death.

Clum and his Epitaph 

John Clum was no stranger to southern Arizona when he decided to relocate from Tucson to Tombstone in 1880. In Tucson, Clum had published the Tucson Citizen, another landmark Arizona newspaper. Prior to taking over the Citizen, Clum had been the U. S. government appointee in charge of the San Carlos Apache Indian Reservation. While there, Clum had the distinction of being the only U.S. authority to capture Geronimo, the renegade Apache, although he was later released. He did not finally surrender to the U.S. Army until 1886, bringing the Apache Wars period to an end.

Chided by associates who said he would write an epitaph and not a newspaper, Clum was inspired to call his new publication The Tombstone Epitaph. Setting a tone followed by several subsequent owners and editors, Clum sang Tombstone's praises when he launched what he initially saw as a mining journal. As mayor of Tombstone and publisher of its Republican paper (the rival Italic Nugget provided the Democratic counterpoint), Clum was among the group of townspeople who supported the Earp brothers as they attempted to enforce law and order in Tombstone in the early 1880s. Tensions between the factions—the Earps and the "cowboys"—escalated to a violent showdown near the O.K. Corral in 1881. In an explosion of gunfire, the Earps and their eclectic friend, Doc Holliday, killed three young cowboys—Frank and Tom McClaury and Billy Clanton. Personal, professional and political disagreements found their outlet on that cold October afternoon, producing an event that continues to inspire historical research and debate.

Although an inquest into the shootout determined the shootings were justified, public opinion in Tombstone was with the outlaw Cowboys. The Earps soon left Tombstone, as did Clum, who traveled to Washington, D.C., to accept employment with the U.S. Post Office. Ownership of The Epitaph fell to former political adversaries.

After Clum left, The Epitaph remained a going concern, though it could never regain the standing it had prior to 1886, the year Tombstone's silver boom began to crumble as silver prices fell and the mines filled with water. Subsequent editors predicted a return to the heady days of the 1880s, but such a turnaround in the town's financial fortunes never occurred.

Tombstone's future seemed tied to its relatively mild desert climate, the emergence of automobile tourism in the 1920s, and its sometimes violent history. Such were the elements that underlay Tombstone's first Helldorado celebration in 1929—an event orchestrated by one of Tombstone's greatest boosters, editor William Kelly. But soon Kelly was gone and The Epitaph passed into new hands as it continued to cover local news and take on job printing from area clients.

Television Westerns
The Epitaph and its editor (referred to as "Harris Claibourne") were prominently featured in many episodes of the television Western series Tombstone Territory, which aired from 1957 through 1960. (The actual editor at that time, Clayton A. Smith, was credited for his "full cooperation" at the end of many episodes). In addition, the rivalry between The Epitaph and The Nugget was featured in a 1959 episode of the TV Western series The Life and Legend of Wyatt Earp, which also devoted an episode to "Fighting Editor" John Clum the following year.

A new era in the Old West 
By the early 1960s, popular interest in Old West history and western vacations put Tombstone, Arizona, on the map once again. Led by Harold O. Love, of Detroit, Mich., investors purchased The Epitaph, the O. K. Corral, the Crystal Palace, and Schieffelin Hall, and set about to showcase them to Tombstone visitors. As more and more Epitaph visitors expressed interest in learning more about Tombstone and Old West history, the newspaper owners decided to split the paper into 2 separate editions—a national historical monthly and a local weekly newspaper. In doing so, the owners felt they could serve the interests of visitors and residents at the same time.

In 1975, The Tombstone Epitaph National Edition was launched as "the historical monthly journal of the Old West." Since that time, it has showcased the research of western writers and historians with stories devoted to western exploration, mining and ranching history, outlaw and lawman history, Native American history, the U. S. Army and warfare in the West, western women, frontier photography, and western personalities, among other topics. Named a national journalistic landmark by Sigma Delta Chi, the Society of Professional Journalists, the monthly journal reaches an international audience.

Publication

The national historical monthly is published by Tombstone Epitaph, Inc., an Arizona corporation.
In addition to publishing the historical monthly, The Epitaph office in Tombstone's historical district welcomes visitors from 9:30 a.m. and 5 p.m. daily. Inside of Tombstone's oldest continually operated business, visitors can watch a free video presentation on printing in the 1880s, view a Washington flat bed press on which early issues of The Epitaph were printed, explore a large museum devoted to the era of "hot metal" printing, see rare photographs and other early Tombstone newspapers, and learn much about the life of John Philip Clum, the frontiersman who started The Epitaph after Tombstone burst on the western mining scene after silver was discovered by Ed Schieffelin in 1877.

Subscriptions – $25 in the U.S. and $50 elsewhere—can be started by visiting The Epitaph's website or by writing to The Tombstone Epitaph, P.O. Box 1880, Tombstone, AZ 85638.

In 1975, Tombstone Epitaph, Inc. reached an agreement with the University of Arizona Journalism Department to continue publication of the local edition, which circulates in Tombstone. The local edition was produced by journalism students on a biweekly basis during the academic year until 2018.

List of editors
 John Clum (1881–1882)
 Sam Purdy (1882)
 Charles Reppy (1882–1886)
 Harry Brooks (1886)
 J. O. Dunbar (1886–1891)
 Stanley C. Bagg (1891–1895)
 William Hattich (1895–1913)
 Columbus Giragi (1913–1926)
 William B. Kelly (1926–1930)
 Walter Cole (1930–1938)
 Clayton A. Smith (1938–1964)
 Harold O. Love (1964)
 Wayne Winters (1964–1974)
 E. Dean Prichard (1974–2006)
 Wallace Clayton (1990–1998)
 Frederick A. Schoemehl (2007–2017)
 Mark Boardman (2017–Present)

See also
 Calico Print (magazine)
 Desert Rat Scrap Book
 Ten Percent Ring

Notes

References 
 Tombstoneepitaph.com – Epitaph History, Accessed 24 March 2009

External links
 Official Tombstone Epitaph website
 Arizona.edu Tombstone Epitaph

Newspapers published in Arizona
Newspapers established in 1880
1880 establishments in Arizona Territory
History of Arizona
Cochise County conflict